Gaither House is a historic home located at Morganton, Burke County, North Carolina.  It was built about 1840, and is a one-story, three-bay, hip roofed, Greek Revival style frame house.  It features a three-bay, pedimented entrance porch supported by four, large, fluted Doric order columns.  It was the home of Burgess Sidney Gaither (1807-1892), a Whig party attorney long prominent in local and state political activities.

It was listed on the National Register of Historic Places in 1976.

References

Houses on the National Register of Historic Places in North Carolina
Greek Revival houses in North Carolina
Houses completed in 1840
Houses in Burke County, North Carolina
National Register of Historic Places in Burke County, North Carolina